The Copa Integração was a friendly Brazilian football competition held in the Northeast Region. Its purpose was to prepare the clubs for the following season.

List of champions

Titles by team

Titles by state

Defunct football cup competitions in Brazil